"The Darkside" is a fourth single by German band Hypetraxx, released in 1999. The song peaked at number 4 on the Norwegian singles chart.

Track listing

Charts

Weekly charts

Year-end charts

Certifications

Release history

References 

1999 singles
1999 songs
Song articles with missing songwriters